A birthday party is a party to celebrate the anniversary of someone's birth. 

"Birthday Party" or "The Birthday Party" may also refer to:

Theatre, film, and television 
 The Birthday Party (1931 film), a Mickey Mouse cartoon
 The Birthday Party (play), a 1958 play by Harold Pinter
 The Birthday Party (1968 film), a 1968 film adaption
 "The Birthday Party" (My Name Is Earl), an episode of My Name Is Earl
 "The Birthday Party" (Dynasty 1981), a 1981 episode of Dynasty
 "The Birthday Party" (Dynasty 2017), a 2021 episode of the Dynasty reboot series
King Cole's Birthday Party or Birthday Party, a 1947-49 American TV series

Music 
 The Birthday Party (band), a post-punk band
 The Birthday Party (The Birthday Party album), a 1980 album
 The Birthday Party (The Idle Race album), a 1968 album
 Birthday Party, a 1998 album by Dave Pegg
 The Birthday Party (video), a 1985 concert video by Motörhead
 "Birthday Party", a 1963 hit song by The Pixies Three
 "Birthday Party", a 2019 song by AJR from Neotheater

Other uses 
 The Birthday Party (novel), a 2007 novel by Panos Karnezis
 Birthday Party, the political party that was formed as part of Kanye West's 2020 presidential campaign

See also 
 Birthday (disambiguation)
 Party (disambiguation)